International language may refer to:

 Esperanto, whose original name was international language
 Unua Libro or Dr. Esperanto's International Language, the first book detailing Esperanto
 International auxiliary language, a language meant for communication between people who do not share a common native language
 International English, a concept of the English language as a global means of communication
 International Sign
 Lingua franca, any language widely used beyond the population of its native speakers
 Love
 Mathematics
 Music
 Universal language, a hypothetical historical or mythical language said to be spoken and understood by all of the world's population
 World language, a language spoken internationally

Other uses 
 International Language (album), a 1993 album by Cabaret Voltaire